Momarka is a village in the municipality of Levanger in Trøndelag county, Norway. It is located just south of the town of Levanger.  The Nordlandsbanen railway line and the European route E6 highway both run through the village. Since 2002, Momarka has been considered a part of the town of Levanger urban area so separate population statistics are no longer tracked.

References

Villages in Trøndelag
Levanger